Pepin II (c. 817—after 850) was Count of Vermandois, lord of Senlis, Péronne and Saint Quentin. He was son of King Bernard of Italy (a grandson of Charlemagne) and his Queen, Cunigunda of Laon. He supported Emperor Lothar after the death of Emperor Louis the Pious, despite having sworn allegiance to Charles the Bald.

Pepin’s wife is unknown; their children were:
Bernard II, Count of Laon 
Pepin III, Count of Vermandois 
Herbert I, Count of Vermandois
Cunigunda?

Notes

References

Herbertien dynasty
810s births
Place of birth unknown
Sons of kings
Year of birth uncertain
Year of death unknown
Counts of Vermandois
Carolingian dynasty